Sir Gavin Rylands de Beer  (1 November 1899 – 21 June 1972) was a British evolutionary embryologist, known for his work on heterochrony as recorded in his 1930 book Embryos and Ancestors. He was director of the Natural History Museum, London, president of the Linnean Society of London, and a winner of the Royal Society's Darwin Medal for his studies on evolution.

Biography
Born on 1 November 1899 in Malden, Surrey (now part of London), de Beer spent most of his childhood in France, where he was educated at the Parisian École Pascal. During this time, he also visited Switzerland, a country with which he remained fascinated for the rest of his life. His education continued at Harrow and Magdalen College, Oxford, where he graduated with a degree in zoology in 1921, after a pause to serve in the First World War in the Grenadier Guards and the Army Education Corps. In 1923 he was made a fellow of Merton College, Oxford, and began to teach at the university's zoology department. In 1938, he was made reader in embryology at University College, London. 

During the Second World War, he again served with the Grenadier Guards reaching the rank of temporary lieutenant colonel. He worked in intelligence, propaganda and psychological warfare. In 1940, he was elected as a Fellow of the Royal Society.

In 1945, de Beer became professor of zoology and was, from 1946 to 1949, president of the Linnean Society. Then he was director of the British Museum (Natural History) (now the Natural History Museum), from 1950 until his retirement in 1960. He was knighted in 1954, and awarded the Darwin Medal of the Royal Society in 1957. 

In 1958, he delivered the British Academy's Master-Mind Lecture, on Charles Darwin. In 1961 he gave the Royal Society of London's Wilkins Lecture.

After his retirement, de Beer moved to Switzerland and worked on several publications on Charles Darwin, including first publication of Darwin's manuscripts including his private notebooks, opening them to scholarship which became the "Darwin Industry". He also wrote his own seminal Atlas of Evolution and a series of books about Switzerland and the Alps. De Beer returned to England in 1971 and died at Alfriston, Sussex on 21 June 1972.

Work
De Beer's early work at Oxford was influenced by J. B. S. Haldane and by Julian Huxley and E. S. Goodrich (two of his teachers). His early work was in experimental embryology; some of it was done in collaboration with Huxley, who would go on to be one of the leading figures of the modern synthesis. The Elements of experimental embryology, written with Huxley, was the best summary of the field at that time (1934).

In Embryos and Ancestors (1930) de Beer stressed the importance of heterochrony, and especially paedomorphosis in evolution. According to his theories, paedomorphosis (the retention of juvenile features in the adult form) is more important in evolution than gerontomorphosis, since juvenile tissues are relatively undifferentiated and capable of further evolution, whereas highly specialised tissues are less able to change. He also conceived the idea of clandestine evolution, which helped to explain the sudden changes in the fossil record which were apparently at odds with Darwin's gradualist theory of evolution. If a novelty were to evolve gradually in an animal's juvenile form, then its development would not appear in the fossil record at all, but if the species were then to undergo neoteny (a form of paedomorphosis in which sexual maturity is reached while in an otherwise juvenile form), then the feature would appear suddenly in the fossil record, despite having evolved gradually.

De Beer worked on paleornithology and general evolutionary theory, and was largely responsible for elucidating the concept of mosaic evolution, as illustrated by his review of Archaeopteryx in 1954. De Beer's also reviewed Haeckel's concept of heterochrony, with particular emphasis on its role in avian evolution, especially that of the ratites, in 1956. Dedicated to the popularisation of science, he received the Kalinga Prize from UNESCO.

De Beer was the first to propose the Col de la Traversette as the likely site where Hannibal had crossed the Alps with his elephants. His thesis received support in 2016 when Mahaney et al. reported that sediments had been identified at the pass that had been churned up by "the constant movement of thousands of animals and humans" and dated them to the time of Hannibal's invasion.

De Beer and the modern synthesis 
The conventional view had been that developmental biology had little influence on the modern synthesis, but the following assessment suggests otherwise, at least as far as de Beer is concerned:

Publications
Comparative, Embryology And Evolution Of Chordate Animals (1922)
Growth – 1924
An introduction to experimental embryology – 1926
The comparative anatomy, histology and development of the pituitary body – 1926
Vertebrate Zoology – 1928
Early travellers in the Alps – 1930
Embryology and evolution – 1930 (later editions bore the title Embryos and ancestors)
Alps and men. London, 1932
The Elements of Experimental Embryology – 1934 (co-written with Julian Huxley)
The development of the vertebrate skull – 1937
Gavin de Beer (editor:) Evolution: Essays on aspects of evolutionary biology. Oxford 1938.
Escape to Switzerland – 1945
Sir Hans Sloane and the British Museum - 1953
Archaeopteryx lithographica – 1954
Alps and elephants. Hannibal's march – 1955
The first ascent of Mont Blanc – 1957
Darwin's journal: Darwin's notebooks on the transmutation of species – 1959
The sciences were never at war – 1960
Reflections of a Darwinian – 1962
Charles Darwin: evolution by natural selection – 1963
Atlas of Evolution – 1964
Charles Scott Sherrington: an appreciation – 1966
Early travellers in the Alps – 1967
Edward Gibbon and his world – 1968
Hannibal: Challenging Rome's Supremacy – 1969
Homology, an unsolved problem – 1971
Jean-Jacques Rousseau and his world – 1972

References

1899 births
1972 deaths
British evolutionary biologists
Charles Darwin biographers
Developmental biologists
20th-century British zoologists
Directors of the Natural History Museum, London
Fellows of the Royal Society
People educated at Harrow School
Alumni of Magdalen College, Oxford
Academics of University College London
Presidents of the Linnean Society of London
Knights Bachelor
Kalinga Prize recipients
British science writers
Grenadier Guards officers
British Army personnel of World War I
British Army personnel of World War II
Fellows of Merton College, Oxford
Modern synthesis (20th century)
People from New Malden